If You Could See Me Now is an album by Oscar Peterson's quartet, recorded in November 1983.

Reception

The Penguin Guide to Jazz described the album as "a thin set altogether". A reviewer for The Washington Post highlighted "Limehouse Blues", describing it as "fueled by some of the most dynamic and daring excursions this quartet has ever put on record." The album won the Juno Award for Best Jazz Album in 1987.

Track listing
 "Weird Blues" (Miles Davis) – 6:42
 "If I Should Lose You" (Ralph Rainger, Leo Robin) – 6:18
 "On Danish Shore" (Oscar Peterson, Niels-Henning Ørsted Pedersen) – 8:28
 "L' Impossible" (Peterson) – 6:00
 "If You Could See Me Now" (Tadd Dameron, Carl Sigman) – 7:26
 "Limehouse Blues" (Philip Braham, Douglas Furber) – 6:02

Personnel

Performance
 Oscar Peterson – piano
 Joe Pass – guitar
 Niels-Henning Ørsted Pedersen – double bass
 Martin Drew – drums

References

1983 albums
Oscar Peterson albums
Albums produced by Norman Granz
Pablo Records albums
Juno Award for Best Jazz Album albums